Edwin Evans (February 2, 1860, Lehi, Utah - March 3, 1946, Los Angeles) was an American landscape painter and teacher. In 1890, he was one of a group of painters who studied in Paris under the sponsorship of the Church of Jesus Christ of Latter-day Saints (LDS Church), in preparation for painting murals at the nearly completed Salt Lake Temple.

Biography
His father was Bishop David Evans (1804-1883), founder of the city where he was born, which was originally called "Evansville". From an early age, he drew sketches as a hobby, but didn't consider becoming an artist. While he was employed as a railway telegraph operator, his work was noticed by Alonzo Hyde (1848-1910), the son of Orson Hyde, an early LDS Church leader. He encouraged Evans to begin studying art and offered to provide support. Soon after, in the 1880s, Evans and his wife went to Salt Lake City, where he studied with George M. Ottinger and Dan Weggeland.

In 1888, he received further support from Hyde to go to Paris. Two years later, together with John Fairbanks, John Hafen and Lorus Pratt, he was awarded a two-year scholarship to study at the Académie Julian in Paris, where their primary instructor was Albert Rigolot, and they became known as the "French Art Missionaries". Upon their return, they executed the murals and frescoes for the Salt Lake Temple, which was consecrated in 1893.  He also created murals for the Cardston Alberta Temple and the Veterans' Hospital in Salt Lake City.

Later that year, with Hafen and James Taylor Harwood, he founded an "Academy of Art" in Salt Lake City. His canvas "Grain Fields" (or "Wheat Field"), painted while he was in France, won Honorable Mention at the Columbian Exposition in Chicago. In 1898, he was appointed President of the "Institute of Fine Arts" at the University of Utah and taught there until 1919. His best-known student was LeConte Stewart. He also gave lessons at his private studios, church schools and the YMCA.

During his later years, he returned to Paris for several exhibits, concentrated largely on watercolors and donated many of his paintings to Brigham Young University and Lehi High School. A major retrospective of his work was held in 1941.

References

Further reading 
Robert Olpin, Thomas Rugh; Painters of the Wasatch Mountains, Salt Lake City, Gibbs Smith, Publisher, 2005 
Robert Olpin, Donna Poulton, Vern Swanson; Utah art, Utah artists : 150 year survey, Layton, Gibbs Smith, 2001

External links 

A Collection of his paintings,  the Utah Museum of Fine Arts.

1860 births
1946 deaths
American Latter Day Saint artists
Artists from Utah
Landscape painters
19th-century American painters
American male painters
20th-century American painters
People from Lehi, Utah
Latter Day Saints from Utah
American expatriates in France
19th-century American male artists
20th-century American male artists